Emilio Vazquez is a former Democratic member of the Pennsylvania House of Representatives who represented the 197th House district in Philadelphia, Pennsylvania.

Political career
Vazquez was elected as a write-in candidate in a March 2017 special election to replace Leslie Acosta in Pennsylvania's 197th district. Acosta had resigned in January 2017 following her guilty plea to a fraud charge (the second recent state representative of the 197th district to do so), while the original Democratic candidate to succeed her was kicked off the ballot for not actually residing in the 197th district. While Vazquez was sworn into office, this election is currently under investigation by the Philadelphia Attorney General's Office and Pennsylvania Attorney General. Vazquez is also currently a defendant in a federal lawsuit regarding instances of widespread voter intimidation and election fraud for the election of which he was declared the winner. There is a possibility that the federal court could declare the election null and void and order an entirely new election. Vazquez is a Democratic ward leader and Philadelphia Parking Authority employee.

In the 2018 Democratic primary for his seat, Vazquez placed third, losing to former City Council aide Danilo Burgos. Burgos is the current Representative for Pennsylvania's 197th district.

Election results

References

External links
Ballotpedia

Hispanic and Latino American people in Pennsylvania politics
Hispanic and Latino American state legislators in Pennsylvania
Year of birth missing (living people)
Living people
Democratic Party members of the Pennsylvania House of Representatives